Subramanya Ramachandra Iyer (1 October 1901 - date of death unknown) was an Indian lawyer who served as the Chief Justice of the Madras High Court from 10 May 1961 to 1 November 1964. Madras lawyer Vasantha Pai found evidence that Iyer had falsified his birth date to avoid compulsory retirement at the age of 60 including  going to the Judge's birthplace and photographing his original birth register which showed his real age. Judge Iyer denied that he was over 60 years. It became a scandal after the Judge's younger brother, Subramanya Balakrishnan sent invitations to celebrate his 60th birthday while his elder brother the Judge's age was shown as below 60 years. Pai filed a petition. Iyer resigned on 1 November 1964 on a request from the then  Chief Justice of India P. B. Gajendragadkar as the case would damage the judiciary  and this led the petition to be eventually dismissed in 1967 on the grounds that Iyer had already resigned his judgeship.

References 

20th-century Indian judges
Chief Justices of the Madras High Court
1901 births
Year of death missing